Adoro may refer to:
Marcus Adoro (born 1971)

Music
Adoro (band), German opera music project
Adoro, an album by Franck Pourcel and orchestra, 1970
Adoro (Plácido Domingo album), 1990
Adoro, an album by Adoro
"Adoro" (song), a 1967 song by Armando Manzanero